Emilia Lanier (also Aemilia or Amelia Lanyer, 1569–1645), née Aemilia Bassano, was an English poet and the first woman in England to assert herself as a professional poet, through her volume Salve Deus Rex Judaeorum (Hail, God, King of the Jews, 1611). Attempts have been made to equate her with Shakespeare's "Dark Lady".

Biography
Emilia Lanier's life appears in her letters, poetry, and medical and legal records, and in sources for the social contexts in which she lived. Researchers have found interactions with Lanier in astrologer Dr Simon Forman's (1552–1611) professional diary, the earliest known casebook kept by an English medical practitioner. She visited Forman many times in 1597 for consultations that incorporated astrological readings, as was usual in the medical practice of the period. The evidence from Forman is incomplete and sometimes hard to read (Forman's poor penmanship has caused critical problems to past scholars). However, his notes show she was an ambitious woman keen to rise into the gentry class.

Early life

Church records show Lanier was baptised Aemilia Bassano at the parish church of St Botolph, Bishopsgate, on 27 January 1569. Her father, Baptiste Bassano, was a Venetian-born musician at the court of Elizabeth I. Her mother was Margret Johnson (born c. 1545–1550), who was possibly an aunt of the court composer Robert Johnson. Lanier's sister, Angela Bassano, married Joseph Hollande in 1576, but neither of her brothers, Lewes and Phillip, reached adulthood. It has been suggested, and disputed, that Lanier's family was Jewish or of partly Jewish descent. Susanne Woods calls the evidence for it "circumstantial but cumulatively possible". Leeds Barroll says Lanier was "probably a Jew", her baptism being "part of the vexed context of Jewish assimilation in Tudor England."

Baptiste Bassano died on 11 April 1576, when Emilia was seven years old. His will instructed his wife that he had left young Emilia a dowry of £100, to be given to her when she turned 21 or on the day of her wedding, whichever came first. Forman's records indicate that Bassano's fortune might have waned before he died, which caused considerable unhappiness.

Forman's records also indicate that after the death of her father, Lanier went to live with Susan Bertie, Countess of Kent. Some scholars question whether Lanier went to serve Bertie or be fostered by her, but there is no conclusive evidence for either possibility. It was in Bertie's house that Lanier was given a humanist education and learnt Latin. Bertie greatly valued and emphasized the importance of girls receiving the same level of education as young men. This probably influenced Lanier and her decision to publish her writings. After living with Bertie, Lanier went to live with Margaret Clifford, Countess of Cumberland and Margaret's daughter, Lady Anne Clifford. Dedications in Lanier's own poetry seem to confirm this information.

Lanier's mother died when Lanier was 18. Church records show that Johnson was buried in Bishopsgate on 7 July 1587.

Adulthood
Not long after her mother's death, Lanier became the mistress of The 1st Baron Hunsdon, a Tudor courtier and cousin of Queen Elizabeth I. At the time, Lord Hunsdon was Elizabeth's Lord Chamberlain and a patron of the arts and theatre, but he was 45 years older than Lanier, and records show he gave her a pension of £40 a year. Records indicate that Lanier enjoyed her time as his mistress. An entry from Forman's diary reads, "[Lanier] hath bin married 4 years/ The old Lord Chamberlain kept her longue She was maintained in great pomp ... she hath 40£ a yere & was welthy to him that married her in monie & Jewells."

In 1592, when she was 23, Lanier became pregnant with Hunsdon's child, but he paid her off with a sum of money. Lanier was then married to her first cousin once removed, Alfonso Lanier. He was a Queen's musician; church records show the marriage taking place at St Botolph's Aldgate on 18 October 1592.

Forman's diary entries imply that Lanier's marriage was unhappy. The diary also relates that Lanier was happier as Lord Hunsdon's mistress than as Alfonso's bride, for "a nobleman that is ded hath Loved her well & kept her and did maintain her longe but her husband hath delte hardly with her and spent and consumed her goods and she is nowe... in debt." Another of Forman's entries states that Lanier told him about having several miscarriages. Lanier gave birth to a son, Henry, in 1593 (presumably named after his father, Henry, Lord Hunsdon) and a daughter, Odillya, in 1598. Odillya died when she was ten months old and was buried at St Botolph's.

In 1611, Lanier published her volume of poetry, Salve Deus Rex Judaeorum. Lanier, 42 years old at the time, was the first woman in England to declare herself a poet. People who read her poetry considered it radical, and many scholars today refer to its style and arguments as protofeminist.

Older years
After Alfonso's death in 1613, Lanier supported herself by running a school. She rented a house from Edward Smith to house her students, but disputes over the rental led to her being arrested twice between 1617 and 1619. Parents then proved unwilling to send their children to a woman with a history of arrest and Lanier's aspirations of running a prosperous school came to an end.

Lanier's son eventually married Joyce Mansfield in 1623; they had two children, Mary (1627) and Henry (1630). Henry senior died in October 1633. Later court documents imply that Lanier may have been providing for her two grandchildren after their father's death.

Little else is known of Lanier's life between 1619 and 1635. Court documents state that she sued her husband's brother, Clement, for money owed to her from the profits of one of her late husband's financial patents. The court ruled in Lanier's favour, requiring Clement to pay her £20. Clement could not pay immediately, and so Lanier brought the suit back to court in 1636 and in 1638. There are no records to say whether Lanier was ever paid in full, but at the time of her death, she was described as a "pensioner", i. e. someone who has a steady income or pension.

Emilia Lanier died at the age of 76 and was buried at Clerkenwell, on 3 April 1645.

Poetry

In 1611, at the age of 42, Lanier published a collection of poetry called Salve Deus Rex Judaeorum (Hail, God, King of the Jews). At the time it was still highly unusual for an Englishwoman to publish, especially in an attempt to make a living. Emilia was only the fourth woman in the British Isles to publish poetry. Hitherto, Isabella Whitney had published a 38-page pamphlet of poetry partly written by her correspondents, Anne Dowriche, who was Cornish, and Elizabeth Melville, who was Scottish. So Lanier's book is the first book of substantial, original poetry written by an Englishwoman. She wrote it in the hope of attracting a patron. It was also the first potentially feminist work published in England, as all the dedications are to women and the title poem "Salve Deus Rex Judaeorum", about the crucifixion of Christ, is written from a woman's point of view. Her poems advocate and praise female virtue and Christian piety, but reflect a desire for an idealized, classless world.

Influences
Source analysis shows that Lanier draws on work that she mentions reading, including Edmund Spenser, Ovid, Petrarch, Chaucer, Boccaccio, Agrippa, as well as protofeminists like Veronica Franco and Christine de Pizan. Lanier makes use of two unpublished manuscripts and a published play translation by Mary Sidney, Countess of Pembroke. She also shows a knowledge of stage plays by John Lyly and Samuel Daniel. The work of Samuel Daniel informs her Masque, a theatrical form identified in her letter to Mary Sidney and resembling the Masque in The Tempest.

Poems
The title poem "Salve Deus Rex Judæorum" is prefaced by ten shorter dedicated poems, all for aristocratic women, beginning with the Queen. There is also a prose preface addressed to the reader, containing a vindication of "virtuous women" against their detractors. The title poem, a narrative work of over 200 stanzas, tells the story of Christ's passion satirically and almost entirely from the point of view of the women who surround him. The title comes from the words of mockery supposedly addressed to Jesus on the Cross. The satirical nature of the poem was first emphasized by Boyd Berry. Although the topics of virtue and religion were seen as suitable themes for women writers, Lanier's title poem has been viewed by some modern scholars as a parody of the Crucifixion, since Lanier approaches it with imagery of the Elizabethan grotesque, found, for instance, in some Shakespeare plays. Her views have been interpreted as "independent of church tradition" and heretical. Other scholars including A. L. Rowse view Lanier's conversion as genuine and her passionate devotion to Christ and to his mother as sincere. Still, comparisons have been made between Lanier's poem and religious satires that scholars have studied in Shakespearean works, including the poem The Phoenix and the Turtle and many of the plays.

In the central section of Salve Deus Lanier takes up the Querelle des Femmes by redefining Christian doctrine of "The Fall", and attacking Original Sin, which is the foundation of Christian theology and Pauline doctrine about women causing it. Lanier defends Eve and women in general by arguing that Eve is wrongly blamed for Original Sin, while no blame attached to Adam. She argues that Adam shares the guilt, as he is shown in the Bible as being stronger than Eve, and so capable of resisting the temptation. She also defends women by noting the dedication of Christ's female followers in staying with him through the Crucifixion and first seeking him after the burial and Resurrection.

In Salve Deus, Lanier also draws attention to Pilate's wife, a minor character in the Bible, who attempts to prevent the unjust trial and crucifixion of Christ. She also notes the male apostles that forsook and even denied Christ during His Crucifixion. Lanier repeats the anti-Semitic aspects of the Gospel accounts: hostile attitudes towards the Jews for not preventing the Crucifixion – such views were the norm for her period.

There is no scholarly consensus on the religious motivation of the title poem. Some call it a genuinely religious poem from a strong, female angle. Others see it as a piece of clever satire. Although there is no agreement on intent and motive, most scholars note the strong feminist sentiments throughout Salve Deus Rex Judæorum.

Lanier's book ends with the "Description of Cookham," commemorating Margaret Clifford, Countess of Cumberland and her daughter Lady Anne Clifford. This is the first published country-house poem in English (Ben Jonson's better known "To Penshurst" may have been written earlier but was first published in 1616.) Lanier's inspiration came from a stay at Cookham Dean, where Margaret Clifford, Countess of Cumberland, lived with her daughter Lady Anne Clifford, for whom Lanier was engaged as tutor and companion. The Clifford household possessed a significant library, some of which can be identified in the painting The Great Picture, attributed to Jan van Belcamp. As Helen Wilcox asserts, the poem is an allegory of the expulsion from Eden.

Feminist themes
Salve Deus Rex Judaeorum has been viewed by many as one of the earliest feminist works in English literature. Barbara Kiefer Lewalski in an article, "Writing Women and Reading the Renaissance", actually calls Lanier the "defender of womankind". Lewalski believes Lanier initiates her ideas of the genealogy of women with the first few poems in the collection, as dedications to prominent women. This follows the idea that "virtue and learning descend from mothers to daughters."

Marie H. Loughlin continues Lewalski's argument in "'Fast ti'd unto Them in a Golden Chaine': Typology, Apocalypse, and Woman's Genealogy in Aemilia Lanier's Salve Deus Rex Judaeorum" by noting that the genealogy of women began with Eve. Loughlin argues that Lanier advocates the importance of knowledge of the spiritual and the material worlds in women's connection. Lanier seems to argue that women must focus on the material world and their importance in it, to complement their life in the spiritual world. The argument derives from Lanier's seeming desire to raise women to the level of men.

Dark Lady theory

The Sonnets
Some have speculated that Lanier was Shakespeare's "Dark Lady". The identification, first proposed by A. L. Rowse, has been repeated by several authors since. It appears in David Lasocki and Roger Prior's book The Bassanos: Venetian Musicians and Instrument makers in England 1531–1665 (1995) and in Stephanie Hopkins Hughes. Although the colour of Lanier's hair is not known, records exist of her Bassano cousins being referred to as "black", a common term at the time for brunettes or people with Mediterranean colouring. Since she came from a family of Court musicians, she fits Shakespeare's picture of a woman playing the virginal in Sonnet 128. Shakespeare claims that the woman was "forsworn" to another in Sonnet 152, which has been speculated to refer to Lanier's relations with Shakespeare's patron, Lord Hunsdon. The theory that Lanier was the Dark Lady is doubted by other Lanier scholars, such as Susanne Woods (1999). Barbara Lewalski notes that Rowse's theory has deflected attention from Lanier as a poet. However, Martin Green argued that although Rowse's argument was unfounded, he was correct in saying that Lanier is referred to in the Sonnets.

Playwrights, musicians and poets have also expressed views. The theatre historian and playwright Andrew B. Harris wrote a play, The Lady Revealed, which chronicles Rowse's identification of Lanier as the "Dark Lady". After readings in London and at the Players' Club, it received a staged reading at New Dramatists in New York City on 16 March 2015. In 2005, the English conductor Peter Bassano, a descendant of Emilia's brother, suggested she provided some of the texts for William Byrd's 1589 Songs of Sundrie Natures, dedicated to Lord Hunsdon, and that one of the songs, a setting of the translation of an Italian sonnet "Of Gold all Burnisht", may have been used by Shakespeare as the model for his parodic Sonnet 130: My mistress' eyes are nothing like the sun. The Irish poet Niall McDevitt also believes Lanier was the Dark Lady: "She spurned his advances somewhere along the line and he never won her back.... It's a genuine story of unrequited love." Tony Haygarth has argued that a certain 1593 miniature portrait by Nicholas Hilliard depicts Lanier.

Plays
John Hudson points out that the names Emilia in Othello and Bassanio in The Merchant of Venice coincide with mentions of a swan dying to music, which he sees as a standard Ovidian image of a great poet. He asserts that the "swan song" may be a literary device used in some classical writings to conceal the name of an author. However, the notion that a dying swan sings a melodious "swan song" was proverbial, and its application to a character need not prove the character is being presented as a poet. So the evidence remains inconclusive and perhaps coincidental.

Furthermore, Prior argues that the play Othello refers to a location in the town of Bassano, and that the title of the play may refer to the Jesuit Girolamo Otello from the town of Bassano. The character Emilia speaks some of the first feminist lines on an English stage and so could be seen as a contemporary allegory for Emilia Lanier herself, while the musicians in both plays, Prior argues, are allegories for members of her family.

Hudson further believes that another "signature" exists in Titus Andronicus, where an Aemilius and a Bassianus each hold a crown. Each mirrors the other's position at the beginning and end of the play, as rhetorical markers indicating that the two names are a pair, and book-end the bulk of the play.

In November 2020, Peter Bassano, a descendant of Lanier's uncle, published a book, Shakespeare and Emilia, claiming to have found proof that Lanier is the Dark Lady. Bassano points to the similarity of Hilliard's alternative miniature to a description of Lord Biron's desired wife in Love's Labour's Lost: "A whitely wanton, with a velvet brow. With two pitch balls stuck in her face for eyes."

Reputation
Lanier was a member of the minor gentry through her Italian father's appointment as a royal musician. She was further educated in the household of Susan Bertie, Countess of Kent. After her parents' death, Lanier was the mistress of Henry Carey, 1st Baron Hunsdon, first cousin of Elizabeth I of England. In 1592, she became pregnant by Carey and was subsequently married to court musician Alfonso Lanier, her cousin. She had two children, but only one survived into adulthood.

Lanier was largely forgotten for centuries, but study of her has abounded in recent decades. She is remembered for contributing to English literature her volume of verses Salve Deus Rex Judaeorum, for which she is seen as the first professional female poet in the English language. Indeed she is known as one of England's first feminist writers in any form, and potentially as the "dark lady" of Shakespearean myth.

In popular culture
The play Emilia by Morgan Lloyd Malcolm, produced in London in 2018, is a "mock history" piece with a feminist message, in which Lanier rebukes Shakespeare for "lift[ing] her words".

Montserrat Lombard portrays Emilia Lanier in a recurring role on the BBC Two series Upstart Crow from 2016 to 2018.

Lanier appears as a character in the 2019 video game Astrologaster.

Lanier is the central character of the novel The Heavens by Sandra Newman.

She is also referred to throughout the Practical Magic series by Alice Hoffman.

See also

Lanier family tree
The Dark Lady Players

Notes

References
Peter Bassano, Shakespeare and Emilia: The Untold Story . Giustiniani Publications. Kindle Edition.
David Bevington, Aemilia Lanyer: Gender, Genre, and the Canon. Lexington: University Press of Kentucky, 1998
Mark Bradbeer, Aemilia Lanyer as Shakespeare's Co-Author. London: Routledge, 2022
John Garrison, 'Aemilia Lanyer's Salve Deus Rex Judaeorum and the Production of Possibility.' Studies in Philology, 109.3, 2012, 290–310
Martin Green, 'Emilia Lanier IS the Dark Lady' English Studies vol. 87, No.5, October 2006, 544–576
John Hudson, Shakespeare's Dark Lady: Amelia Bassano Lanier: The Woman Behind Shakespeare's Plays?, Stroud: Amberley Publishing, 2014
John Hudson, 'Amelia Bassano Lanier: A New Paradigm', The Oxfordian 11, 2008, 65–82
Stephanie Hopkins Hughes, 'New Light on the Dark Lady' Shakespeare Oxford Newsletter, 22 September 2000
David Lasocki and Roger Prior, The Bassanos: Venetian Musicians and Instrument makers in England 1531–1665, Aldershot: Scolar Press, 1995
Peter Matthews, Shakespeare Exhumed: The Bassano Chronicles, Stanthorpe: Bassano Publishing, 2013
Ted Merwin, "The Dark Lady as a Bright Literary Light", The Jewish Week, 23 March 2007, 56–57
Giulio M. Ongaro 'New Documents on the Bassano Family' Early Music vol. 20, 3 August 1992, 409–413
Michael Posner, 'Rethinking Shakespeare' The Queen's Quarterly, vol. 115, no. 2, 2008, 1–15
Michael Posner, 'Unmasking Shakespeare', Reform Judaism Magazine, 2010
Roger Prior, 'Jewish Musicians at the Tudor Court' The Musical Quarterly, vol. 69, no 2, Spring 1983, 253–265
Roger Prior, 'Shakespeare's Visit to Italy', Journal of Anglo-Italian Studies 9, 2008, 1–31
Michelle Powell-Smith, 'Aemilia Lanyer: Redeeming Women Through Faith and Poetry,' 11 April 2000 on-line at Suite101
Roger Prior 'Jewish Musicians at the Tudor Court' The Musical Quarterly, vol. 69, no 2, Spring 1983, 253–265
Ruffati and Zorattini, 'La Famiglia Piva-Bassano Nei Document Degli Archevi Di Bassano Del Grappa,' Musica e Storia, 2 December 1998
Julia Wallace, 'That's Miss Shakespeare To You' Village Voice, 28 March – 3 April 2007, 42
Steve Weitzenkorn, Shakespeare's Conspirator: The Woman, The Writer, The Clues, CreateSpace, 2015
Susanne Woods, Lanyer: A Renaissance Woman Poet, New York: Oxford University Press, 1999)

External links

Full text of Salve Deus Rex Iudæorum
Discussion of the identification of Lanier as the Dark Lady
John Hudson's thesis, that Lanier was the author of Shakespeare's plays
Project Continua: Biography of Aemilia Lanyer
Shakespeare/Lanier walk

1569 births
1645 deaths
English people of Italian descent
People associated with Shakespeare
English women poets
16th-century English women writers
17th-century English women writers
16th-century English writers
17th-century English writers
17th-century educators